Miriam bat Benayah (late 15th-century - early 16th-century) was a Jewish Safra (scribe) in Yemen.

Bat Benayah was the daughter of scribe Benayah ben Sa'adiah ben Zekhariah, and worked with her father and her brothers David and Joseph. They are credited with copying 400 books together, including prayer books, collections of haftarot, and copies of the Torah. It was highly uncommon for a woman to have the profession of scribe in the culture, time and place in which she was active.

References

Sources
 The JPS Guide to Jewish Women: 600 B.C.E.to 1900 C.E.
 https://www.encyclopedia.com/religion/encyclopedias-almanacs-transcripts-and-maps/miriam-bat-benayah

 

Year of birth unknown
Year of death unknown
15th-century Jews
16th-century Jews
15th-century women
16th-century women
Jewish scribes (soferim)
15th century in Yemen
16th century in Yemen
Medieval Jewish women